Ibrahim Tannous (1929 – December 26, 2012) was a former commander of the Lebanese Armed Forces. General Tannous earned a reputation for honesty and was seen as “a general willing to get his uniform dirty to build a fighting Lebanese Army,” in the words of one Arab authority. Gen. Tannous took over command of the Lebanese Armed Forces (LAF) in December 1982, during the early years of the civil war and oversaw joint operations with the Multinational Force that was in charge of training LAF forces and restoring order to Beirut. Gen. Tannous, who is close to President Gemayel, resigned his post as armed forces commander in June 1984 as a concession to government's opposition factions who were calling for restructuring the army and was succeeded by Michel Aoun. Until Gen. Tannous' resignation, the army was one of the most important institution supporting the U.S.-backed Gemayel Government, however, Tannous' departure marked a major shift in the American-trained armed forces towards a policy closely in tune with Syria's foreign policy and security objectives.

Personal life

Born in Kobayat, Akkar, Lebanon in 1929, was married and had four children.

Military career

Enrolled in the Military Academy as a Cadet Officer on 10/16/1952

Promoted to Second Lieutenant on 10/1/1955

Promoted to First Lieutenant on 10/1/1958

Promoted to Captain on 1/1/1965

Promoted to Major on 1/1/1969

Promoted to Lieutenant Colonel of Staff on 7/1/1972

Promoted to Colonel of Staff on 1/1/1980

Promoted to General of Staff on 12/8/1982

Promoted to Lieutenant General on 12/8/1982

Functions

Assigned to 4th artillery regiment on 8/1/1956

Assigned to the Military Academy (Deputy Trainer) on 9/1/1957

Reinstated to the 4th artillery regiment on 8/1/1958

Assigned to the general Headquarters – 4th Bureau on 10/1/1958

Was assigned to the 5th artillery battalion- commander of battalion, on 6/4/1962

Was assigned to the 2nd artillery regiment, artillery brigade (deputy-commander of
regiment) on 1/25/1966

Appointed commander of artillery regiment on 7/3/1968

Appointed chief of the 4th Bureau per Interim, as from 5/21/1965 to 8/16/1970

Appointed Deputy Chief of the 4th Bureau on 8/17/1970

Appointed chief of the Co-operative service at the Social Affairs directorate on 10/4/1971

Appointed chief of the Finance control Office at the directorate of Administrative Control on 4/21/1972

Was assigned to the region of North Lebanon on 7/21/1973

Was assigned to the HQ of the infantry brigade- Chief of Staff of brigade on 8/1/1973

Was assigned to the independent anti-tanks company (artillery commander) on 8/3/1974

Was transferred to the company of the Bekaa regional district - regional deputy to the commander of the region on 7/18/1974

Was detached to the Beirut region Command as from 9/16/1974 to 9/26/1974

Appointed Deputy to the Commander of the Bekaa region on 12/21/1974

Was detached to command by Interim, the Eastern defense Sector, on 2/28/1975

Assigned to the HQ Battalion of the 1st infantry brigade- Chief of Staff of the brigade on 8/18/1975

Assigned to the Army Headquarters Battalion as Chief of the Studies, organization and planning Office on 8/30/1975

Assigned to the Sector No. 3 / Unit 31 as commander of the group on 3/15/1978

Appointed Armed Forces Commander on 12/8/1982

Was released from his duty as the Armed Forces Commander, on his request, and was put at the disposition of the minister of National Defense on 6/23/1984

Transferred to pension on 7/1/1988

Courses inside the country

Enhancement Training Course for officers from 7/16/1968 to 9/28/1968

4 months course in Italian language at the Italian cultural center as from 11/8/1971

Complementary course for officers from 5/7/1968 to 7/13/1968

Rank upgrading course from 5/17/1979 to 10/27/1979

Courses outside the country

Training Course in France from 10/8/1955 to 8/18/1956

Training Course in Italy from 9/26/1972 to 7/2/1975

Medals, awards and honors

Medal for battle wounds

Lebanese order of Merit in Silver

National order of the Cedar in Class of knight

Commemorative Medal of 12/13/1961

National order of the cedar in Officer Class

Lebanese Order of Merit with branches in Second Class

War Medal, two times

National Order of the Cedar, Class of Commander

National order of Merit in Grand Cordon Class

Lebanese Order of Merit in First Class

Commendation of the Minister of National Defense, one time

Commendation of the Armed Forces Commander, two times

Felicitations of the Armed Forces Commander, 3 times

References

Lebanese military personnel
1929 births
2012 deaths
Lebanese Maronites